Moulana Chalilakath Kunhahammad Haji (Arabic: جاللكت كنّ احمد الحاج 1866–1919) was a Malayali Sunni  scholar and Islamic educationalist. He is known for his special attention on the reformation of orthodox Muslims and as father new Madrassa system in southern Indian state of Kerala. scholar and Islamic educationalist. He is known for his special attention on the reformation of orthodox Muslims and as father new Madrassa system in southern Indian state of Kerala.

Early life
Kunhi Ahmed Musliyar was born in 1866 (Hijra-1267) at Adrishery, Kerala, India as the son of Kala Muhyaddeen Kutti and  "Fathima" the  daughter of Kunhai Haji known as Chalilakath Kussay Haji, the friend of Sayyid Alavi Thangal. He was hunted by the destiny as his parents separated in his early childhood and lost the paternal affection. He was brought under the strict rule of mother and uncles within religious background and later known as Chalilakath Kunahmed Musliyar, adding his mother's household with his name. There are three abbreviated forms to this name :‘C.H’.’M,C,C,’ and C.A. Firstmeans Chalilakath, the second one means the relations between mother and father (Muthatt, Cala, Chalilakath) and the last one means Chalilakath. In following days Chalilakath Ahmad Haji's sons also known as M.C.C. or M.C.C Brothers.

Educational field
Chalilakath Haji achieved his primary education In Quran's Thajveed ( a scientific study  about the pattern of Quran recitation, pronunciation of Arabic alphabet) from his mother who possessed a good and deep knowledge and led sacred life. When he expressed interest and enthusiasm in studying, his mother encouraged him to go for further study.
His all uncles and brothers were famous in every religious stage and they were conscious to strengthen the Islamic superiority of yore. The Muslim ulama issued anti- British fatwa (Shareeth based decree), denouncing the material education, but his brother Kutyamma Sahib exuded enough courage to enroll him in school located at Calicut and there he learnt three languages, Malayalam Sanskrit and English. Here he was accompanied with Ali Hassan who shared his knowledge with former. After gaining primary knowledge he accepted the guidance of Ahmed Kutti of Kodancharry, the disciple of Makah mufthi Ahmed Zainy and was known as exponent in  ‘’Thufa’’ of Abdul Hameed Sharwani.
Later he participated in spiritual classes of Ammmu Musliyar who had been careering out the Darse in ‘’Thiriruagadi’’. After acquiring his spiritual matters from masjid of ‘’Thirurathangoor" and "Makadi" mosque of Calicut, he became a disciple of Abdul Azeez Musliyar the composer of "Bader Moulood"(the biography of Bader warriors) and  unforgettable person In Islamic history of Kerala (first Malayali that went to Velloor for higher studies). Here he was accompanied by the luminous scholars like  Muhammad Abdul Jabber and Hazarath Abdul Azeez. The great mystic leaders, Muhammad Rukhundheen Kadiriya and Sheik Muhammad Abdul Azeez Jaleel were the famous teacher of Baqiyath Arabic college. He was not only restrained to the Islamic education, but he owned extra ordinary skill and dexterity in astronomy, logical, philosophy, and geometry from Baqiyath itself. He was blessed with thorough knowledge in Fiqh (Islamic jurisprudence) and commentator on prophet related knowledge, known as Sunnah.
Later he was enrolled another great Religious institution, ‘Lathfiya Arabic College’, which locates at Vellore itself.  After the graduation from Lathifiya College, he spent considerable period under Abdul Halim Sahib (Shaban, H 1311)  studying  about astrology at "Advamiaty", the classical  text from his "Risalathul Marideen". During his stay in Tamil Nadu for the graduation, he  learnt Urdu, Parsi, and Tamil.

Teaching fields
After sipping enough drops of knowledge, he got down to pedagogy field to share his knowledge with other. He rejected the invitation for the teaching post in Latifiya Arabic College and commenced pedagogy in "Tharamal mosque" (literary means hatched the masjid with leaves of palm). Later he conducted lectures in Mayali, Valapattanam, Pulikkal, Vazakkad and  Mannarkad.

Darul Uloom
Darul- Uloom Vazakkad was found in 1871 by austral "Kayappathothy" family and was named as  "Thanmiyathul-Uloom’’.Chalilaktah accepted appointment as the principal of the institution and later he renamed the institution as Darul Uloom . During his tenure as principal, the institution was hailed to the reputed status and was considered the headquarters of Islamic seminaries in Kerala. He introduced many reformation based on the institution and encouraged material studies. The institution witnessed the controversial issues in his life such as Inul Qibla, Madrassa reformation, renovation of Arabic Malayalam script.

Pious scholar and his disciples
Chalilakath kunahmmad Haji not only famed by his respected teachers but also he was famed by his dominant oeuvres and pious disciples. He forced him himself to gain the satisfaction and content of his teacher. So he became a luminous leader of Kerala.

The places where he carried out darsas
Tirurangadi
Mayyazi
Valapattanam
Pulikkal
Mannarkad
Vazakkad
Tharammal
Nallanam

The foremost disciples of Chalilakath Haji
Chalilakath Muhammad Haji
Kutubi Muhammed Musliyar
Cherussery Ahmed Kutty Musliyar
Mohiyadheen of Kattipa Ruthi
Andathod Kunahmed Musliyar
Amanath Hasan Musliyar
Eldest Ahmed Musliyar of cheroor
P.P Unni Mohiyaddin Kutti Musliyar
M.C.C Ahmed Moulavi
M.C.C Abdul Rahman Moulavi
E.K Mohyadden Moulavi

Exhilarating oeuvres
Chalilakath’s reformation did not confined to sermonizing but he attempted to strengthen the Islam by his works simultaneously.  He composed various books for various purposes like stimulatory texts for students of his institution and other prominent works for eradicate renovated scholars. Lot of thought provoking texts is derived from his pen.

Some significant oeuvres of Chalilakath

 

In explanation of Risalatul Murideen he abbreviated the opinions of foreign and internal scholars. This was published by his disciple Sulaiman, native of Mangalore.Nowadays only a few his works are surviving like Atheedathul Baleega Fe Kathaee Davaberil Firkathul Kadiyaniya.

Debate of Inul Qibla
Debate of Inul Qibla is the main incident in Kerala Muslim history in which Chalilakath exuded his stance bravely . After his service in Mayyazi, he was drawn  to Pulikkal by inspiration of Koyakutti Sahib, a pious and mystic scholar of Islam and also his dominant disciple. During his stay at Pullika he examined the direction of Qibla based on Risalathul Marideen, the work done by Ahmed Aleef, his instructor. After the skill full probe, he concluded that the foundation of Masjid was not laid on the exact direction of Qibla and he appointed some of his student to examine the status of other Masjid also. The appointed student also reached to the same conclusion after the thorough investigation. This incident caused to get a flying start in classifying Muslim scholars into two categories.
 The first group scholar argued that there is no compulsory to direct to the exact direction of Qibla, but to direct to its part (west part for Keralite ) is enough.
Another team including Chalilakath Haji insists that from Calicut, people should turn their face to south northern part at 22o correctly, otherwise the Namaz became in veil.
In the wake of these problems, a famous debate between such a two separate categories of Ulama was held at Pulikkal in September 1908 and it became ever mentioned incident in the history of Kerala Muslims. Koyakutti Sahib who invited Chalilakath to Pulikkal turned against him and pious leaders like Kolloly Ahmed Kutti Musliyar, Yusuf Musliyar, and Kutti Ahmed Musliyar of Thattankara also did so. But then Qazi of Kasaragod, Abdulla Moulavi and Hajji's other disciples backed up him to strengthen this ideas and this unforgettable incident later called as debate or dispute of Inul Qibla. To prove his idea, he wrote a book known as Al Dahava Inul Qibla and Thufathul Akhatab.

Reformation of Arabic-Malayalam script
After the service of Darul Uloom (1909–1914), he went to Chalilakath Valapattanam as per the invitation of Sayyid Imbicha Koya. During his stay at Nalllath, the educational revolution erupted in every parts of Kerala and he felt the need of Arabic- Malayalam reformation to ease the difficulties of students to read books. He began to reform of Arabic–Malayalam script in order to ease the difficulties of his student to read the contemporary subject  and to edit some mistakes committed by Sayyid Sanaulla Makti Thangal, who also ventured to such a reform. There were so many people who came forward to reform the Arabic-Malayalam script like Sayyid Sanaulla Makti Thangal (1847–1932), Suleiman Musliyar of Alapuza,Mohammed Abdul Khader Moulavi of Vakkom (1873-1932). But the most considerable and famous reformation in this field belongs to Chalilakath kuunahmed Haji, because all keralites themselves chased and recognized the Chalilakath's reformation and he was called as reformer of Arabic-Malayalam script. Muhammad Abdul Kareem says that "on Hijra 1137, Chalilakath aimed to reform the latter. He wrote it in book and named it as Thasheel Ul Furooq. This was printed in Malharul Muhimmath on 1312h.

Madrasa movement
Historians describe that the Muslims of Kerala fetched religious knowledge by three means
Serious of sermon
Institution base at masjid and this was used for further studies
Madrasa style, which is similar to school style.
In ancient Kerala, Muslims followed Ponnani model to study religious subjects. By early years of this system was threatened to the rise of innovational system. Initially a slight dissatisfaction and discrimination lingered in the minds of Muslims’ scholars. On 1 January 1913, Chalilakath reformed and regulated the Darul Uloom condition with the support of Koyappathoti Muhyaddeen Kutti Haji, he carried out the new system that Darul Uloom various educational condition. He wanted to follow such a reformation and he described his goal through such a reformation. It was the unprecedented reforms and turning point in the Islamic history.

Rules and regulation: in Darul Uloom
He submitted the new syllabus and curriculum to Darul Uloom to strengthen the religious education, he regulated the periods to the Thafseer, Hadeeth, Fiqh, Manthiq, Mahani, Hisab, Tharik (history), geography, Haiath, Handusa, Munalara, Swarf, Nahv, etc. as well as to enlarge their extra ordinary skills in Arabic language both in oration and writing. Also he motivated them to practice in translation Malayalam to Arabic. He punctuated the periods and requested the co-workers to apply his systematic style in these lives also. He introduced attendance system to note the presence of his students and also the vacation system. He brought library system to Darul Uloom. He motivated his student to engage in all stream of education. He also introduced the study of Malayalam grammar to ease their problems. This was steps forward the renovation of Madrasa system.

No reference  no evidence suitable for here

Death
In his life's last days, Kalladi Moidu Kutti Sahib drew his emotion by encouraging him to be in Mannarakad masjid. Henceforth, he worked in Mannarkad masjid until his departure. He had aimed at Mannarkad to risen its reputation and fame with highest possible expedition. Moidu Kutti had promised his physically and financial support.  He breathed his last on Saturday Safar 5, Hijra 1338(1919) and his mortal body was carried from Mannarkad to his one land ‘Tirurangadi’ by bullock cart. He was buried in same burial ground in which his uncle Ali Hassan was buried before. Nowadays this grave can be found in Tharammal masjid, Thirurangadi. After his death, Quran was recited up to 40 days in front of his grave.

References

1866 births
1919 deaths
People from Kasaragod district
19th-century Indian educational theorists
20th-century Indian educational theorists
Scholars from Kerala